Emmanuel Ogbuehi (born August 17, 1990) is an American football tight end. He signed with the Washington Redskins as an undrafted free agent in 2013.

Professional career

Washington Redskins
After going unselected in the 2013 NFL Draft, Ogbuehi signed with the Washington Redskins on May 2, 2013. He was released by the team during their final cuts before the start of the 2013 season.

Miami Dolphins
On June 11, 2014, the Dolphins waived Ogbuehi.

Cleveland Browns
The Cleveland Browns claimed Ogbuehi off waivers on June 12, 2014.

Baltimore Ravens
Ogbuehi was signed to the practice squad of the Baltimore Ravens on November 26, 2014.

Tampa Bay Buccaneers
On April 3, 2015, Ogbuehi was signed by the Tampa Bay Buccaneers.

References

External links
 Georgia State Panthers bio 
 Tampa Bay Buccaneers bio

1990 births
Living people
People from Buford, Georgia
Sportspeople from the Atlanta metropolitan area
Players of American football from Georgia (U.S. state)
American football tight ends
Tampa Bay Buccaneers players